Viscount of Frendraught was a title in the Peerage of Scotland.

It was created on 29 August 1642, along with the title Lord Crichton, for James Crichton, younger of Frendraught, son of James Crichton of Frendraught, who thereafter became known as Crichton of Kinnairdie. The Crichtons of Frendraught were heirs-male of William Crichton, 1st Lord Crichton, who was Lord Chancellor under James II and whose title had been forfeit in 1484.

Viscounts of Frendraught
 James Crichton, 1st Viscount of Frendraught (born c. 1620, died 1664 or 1665)
 James Crichton, 2nd Viscount of Frendraught (died in 1674 or 1675), son of the first Viscount
 William Crichton, 3rd Viscount of Frendraught (died a minor, 1686), son of the second Viscount
 Lewis Crichton, 4th Viscount of Frendraught (died 1698), younger son of the first Viscount

The fourth Viscount, a Jacobite, served with Dundee in the 1689 rising and was attainted on 14 July 1690, when the peerage became forfeit. It was unsuccessfully claimed in 1827 by David Maitland Makgill (later Maitland Makgill Crichton) of Rankeillour, a descendant of the first Viscount's eldest daughter Janet.

References
Francis J. Grant, "Crichton, Lord Frendraught" in The Scots Peerage, vol. iv, pp. 123–134.

Extinct viscountcies in the Peerage of Scotland
Noble titles created in 1642